The East India Bank (1842) was a bank founded in the year 1842 in British India. The bank became defunct with the winding down of its operations in the same year in which it was founded, that is 1842. The bank was notable for being the twenty third oldest bank in India.

History

Founding  

The East India Bank was founded in 1842 in London, England. Though the bank was founded in London, its purpose was to serve the customers residing in British India.

Management 

The bank was staffed by mostly British nationals who were drawn mainly from the East India Company.

The bank was headquartered in London in England.

Final years 

In 1842, the bank was on the verge of failure.

The bank was finally closed in the year 1842.

Legacy 

The bank is notable for being the twenty third oldest bank in India.

The bank played a key role in the history of Banking in India.

See also

Indian banking
List of banks in India

References

External links
 History of the bank by the Reserve Bank of India
 Australian News Snippet
 Economic History

Defunct banks of India
Companies based in London
Banks established in 1842